In April 2005, Saudi authorities launched a series of raids in Ar Rass that killed 15 alleged militants, and captured 7 others. More than fifty Saudi security forces were injured in the gunbattles.

Among those said to be killed, were the following men;
Karim el-Mejjati
His 11-year-old son Adam
Saud Humud al-Utaibi
Abdul-Karim Muhammed Jubran Yazji
Hani ibn Abdullah Al-Joaithen
Faisal ibn Muhammad Al-Baidhani
Majed ibn Muhammad Al-Masoud
Fawaz Mufdhi Al-Anazi
Abdul Rahman ibn Abdullah Al-Jarboue
Nawaf ibn Naif Al-Hafi
Abdussalam ibn Suleiman Al-Khudairy
Talib Saud Al-Talib
Houcine Haski
Younes Khiari

Among those said to be captured, were the following men;
Saleh al-Oufi
Adel ibn Saad Al-Dhubaiti
Hamad ibn Abdullah Al-Humaidi
Saleh ibn Abdul Rahman Al-Shamsan

References

Attacks in Asia in 2005
2005 in Saudi Arabia
Counterterrorism